More Moo-Moos is the third album released by American stand-up comedian Jim Gaffigan.

Track listing
An Interview With the Producer
I Am Nothing
Illegally Blind
Film Director
My Baby's Mama
Hey Good Looking
Intermission One
Speak English
Dumb Traveler
Learning to Walk
Baby's Grama
I'm a Bad Cuddler
Bed Time
I Love Spell Chek
Intermission Two
Calling From a Well
Yeah Right, Sea Cow
Kevin My Pal
Crazy Jim Head
Quigley The Giggly
For the Next Joke
Intermission Three
I Love Doing Nothing
An Interview With a Manatee

External links
DC Improv Comedy Store: Jim Gaffigan

2003 albums
Jim Gaffigan albums
2000s comedy albums